Pratappur is a constituency of the Uttar Pradesh Legislative Assembly covering the city of Pratappur in the Allahabad district of Uttar Pradesh, India.

Pratappur is one of five assembly constituencies in the Bhadohi Lok Sabha constituency. Since 2008, this assembly constituency is numbered 257 amongst 403 constituencies.

Election results

2022

2022
Vijma Yadav of Samajwadi Party won the elections with a margin of more than 10,000 votes.

References

External links
 

Assembly constituencies of Uttar Pradesh
Politics of Allahabad district